was a district in Iyo Province (modern-day Ehime Prefecture), Japan.

History

866 - Uwa District divided into Uwa and Kita Districts.
On February 25, 1876, Okinoshima, Himejima, and Ugurujima Islands were sent to Hata District in Tosa Province
On December 16, 1878, The district was divided to create the Nishiuwa, Higashiuwa, Kitauwa, and Minamiuwa Districts.  The Uwa District was thus dissolved.
Nishiuwa District – Active (The area once included the city of Yawatahama and parts of the cities of Seiyo and Ōzu)
Higashiuwa District – Dissolved on April 1, 2004 (The area once included the cities of Seiyo, Uwajima and Ōzu)
Kitauwa District – Active (The area once included the city of Uwajima (excluding some parts of the city))
Minamiuwa District – Active

References 

Former districts of Ehime Prefecture
Iyo Province